The Song of Kaprun or The Song of the Hohe Tauern (German: Das Lied der Hohen Tauern) is a 1955 Austrian-German drama film directed by Anton Kutter and starring Waltraut Haas, Albert Lieven and Eduard Köck. It is set in Kaprun in the High Tauern mountain range.

The film's sets were designed by the art director Sepp Rothaur. It was shot on location in the state of Salzburg.

Cast

References

Bibliography 
 Fritsche, Maria. Homemade Men in Postwar Austrian Cinema: Nationhood, Genre and Masculinity. Berghahn Books, 2013.

External links 
 

1955 films
1955 drama films
Austrian drama films
German drama films
West German films
1950s German-language films
Films directed by Anton Kutter
Austrian black-and-white films
German black-and-white films
1950s German films